{{DISPLAYTITLE:Megavitamin-B6 syndrome}}

 

Megavitamin-B6 syndrome is a collection of symptoms that can result from chronic supplementation, or acute overdose, of vitamin B6. While it is also known as hypervitaminosis B6, vitamin B6 toxicity and vitamin B6 excess, megavitamin-b6 syndrome is the name used in the ICD-10.

Signs and symptoms 
The predominant symptom is peripheral sensory neuropathy that is experienced as numbness, pins-and-needles and burning sensations (paresthesia) in a patient's limbs on both sides of their body. Patients may experience unsteadiness of gait, incoordination (ataxia), involuntary muscle movements (choreoathetosis) the sensation of an electric zap in their bodies (Lhermitte's sign), a heightened sensitivity to sense stimuli including photosensitivity (hyperesthesia), impaired skin sensation (hypoesthesia), numbness around the mouth, and gastrointestinal symptoms such as nausea and heartburn. The ability to sense vibrations and to sense one's position are diminished to a greater degree than pain or temperature. Skin lesions have also been reported. Megavitamin-B6 syndrome may also contribute to burning mouth syndrome. Potential psychiatric symptoms range from anxiety, depression, agitation, and cognitive deficits to psychosis.

Symptom severity appears to be dose-dependent (higher doses cause more severe symptoms) and the duration of supplementation with vitamin B6 before onset of systems appears to be inversely proportional to the amount taken daily (the smaller the daily dosage, the longer it will take for symptoms to develop). It is also possible that some individuals are more susceptible to the toxic effects of vitamin B6 than others. Megavitamin-B6 syndrome has been reported in doses as low as 24 mg/day.

Symptoms may also be dependent on the form of vitamin B6 taken in supplements. It has been proposed that vitamin B6 in supplements should be in pyridoxal or pyridoxal phosphate form rather than pyridoxine as these are thought to reduce the likelihood of toxicity. A tissue culture study, however, showed that all B6 vitamers that could be converted into active coenzymes (pyridoxal, pyridoxine and pyridoxamine) were neurotoxic at similar concentrations. It has been shown, in vivo, that supplementing with pyridoxal or pyridoxal phosphate increases pyridoxine concentrations in humans, meaning there are metabolic pathways from each vitamer of B6 to the all other forms. Consuming high amounts of vitamin B6 from food has not been reported to cause adverse effects.

Early diagnosis and cessation of vitamin B6 supplementation can reduce the morbidity of the syndrome.

Cause 
While vitamin B6 is water-soluble, it has a half-life of 25–33 days and accumulates in the body, where it is stored in muscle, plasma, the liver, red blood cells and bound to proteins in tissues.

Potential mechanisms 
The common supplemental form of vitamin B6, pyridoxine, is similar to pyridine, which can be neurotoxic. Pyridoxine has limited transport across the blood–brain barrier, explaining why the central nervous system is spared. Cell bodies of motor fibers are located within the spinal cord, which is also restricted by the blood-brain barrier, explaining why motor impairment is rare. The dorsal root ganglia, however, are located outside of the blood-brain barrier making them more susceptible.

Pyridoxine is converted to pyridoxal phosphate via two enzymes, pyridoxal kinase and pyridoxine 5′-phosphate oxidase. High levels of pyridoxine can inhibit these enzymes. As pyridoxal phosphate is the active form of vitamin B6 this saturation of pyridoxine could mimic a deficiency of vitamin B6.

Tolerable upper limits 
Several government agencies have reviewed the data on vitamin B6 supplementation and produced consumption upper limits with the desired goal to prevent sensory neuropathy from excessive amounts. Each agency developed its own criteria for usable studies in relation to tolerable upper limits, and as such the recommendations vary by agency. Between agencies, current tolerable upper limit guidelines vary from 10 mg per day to 100 mg per day.

Reviews of vitamin B6 related neuropathy cautioned that supplementation at doses greater than 50 mg per day for extended periods of time may be harmful and should be discouraged. In 2008, the Australian Complementary Medicines Evaluation Committee recommended warning statements appear on products containing daily doses of 50 mg or more vitamin B6 to avoid toxicity.

The relationship between the amount of vitamin B6 consumed, and serum the levels of those who consume it, varies between individuals. Some people may have high serum concentrations without symptoms of neuropathy. It is not known if inhalation of vitamin B6 while, for example, working with animal feed containing vitamin B6 is safe.

Exceptions
High parenteral doses of vitamin B6 are used to treat isoniazid overdose with no adverse effects found, although a preservative in parenteral vitamin B6 may cause transient worsening of metabolic acidosis. High doses of vitamin B6 are used to treat gyromitra mushroom (false morel) poisoning, hydrazine exposure and homocystinuria Doses of 50 mg to 100 mg per day may also be used to treat pyridoxine deficient seizures and when patients are taking other medications that reduce vitamin B6. Daily doses of 10 mg to 50 mg are recommended for patients undergoing hemodialysis.

Outside of rare medical conditions, placebo-controlled studies have generally failed to show benefits of high doses of vitamin B6. Reviews of supplementing with vitamin B6 have not found it to be effective at reducing swelling, reducing stress, producing energy, preventing neurotoxicity, or treating asthma.

Diagnosis 
The clinical hallmark of megavitamin-B6 syndrome is ataxia due to sensory polyneuropathy. Blood tests are performed to rule out other causes and to confirm an elevated level of vitamin B6 with an absence of hypophosphatasia. Examination does not typically show signs of a motor deficit, dysfunction of the autonomic nervous system or impairment of the central nervous system, although in severe cases motor and autonomic imparement can occur. When examined, patients typically have diminished reflexes (hyporeflexia), such as a diminished response when performing an ankle jerk reflex test. Nerve conduction studies typically show normal motor conduction but decrease in large sensory wave amplitude in the arms and legs. Needle electromyography studies generally reveal no signs of denervation.

Classification 
Megavitamin-B6 syndrome is characterized mainly by degeneration of dorsal root ganglion axons and cell bodies, although it also affects the trigeminal ganglia. It is classified as a sensory ganglionopathy due to involvement of these ganglia. In electrodiagnostic testing,
it has characteristic non-length-dependent abnormalities of sensory action potentials that occur globally, rather than distally decreasing of sensory nerve action potential amplitudes. Megavitamin-B6 syndrome is predominately a large fiber neuropathy characterized by sensory loss of joint position, vibration and ataxia. Although it has characteristics of small fiber neuropathy in severe cases where there is impairment of pain, temperature, and autonomic functions.

Treatment 
The primary treatment for megavitamin-B6 syndrome is to stop taking supplemental vitamin B6. Physical therapy, including vestibular rehabilitation, has been used in attempts to improve recovery following cessation of vitamin B6 supplementation. Medications such as amitriptyline have been used to help with neuropathic pain.

In experimental tests using animal subjects, neurotrophic factors, specifically neurotrophin-3, were shown to potentially reverse the neuropathy caused from the vitamin B6 toxicity. With rats and mice, improvement has also been seen with 4-methylcatechol, a specific chicory extract, coffee and trigonelline.

Prognosis 
Other than with extremely high doses of vitamin B6, neurologic dysfunction improves following cessation of vitamin B6 supplementation and usually, but not always, resolves within six months. In cases of acute high doses, for example in people receiving daily doses of 2 grams of vitamin B6 per kilogram of body weight, symptoms may be irreversible and may additionally cause pseudoathetosis.

In the immediate 2–6 weeks following discontinuation of vitamin B6, patients may experience a symptom progression before gradual improvement begins. This is known as coasting and is encountered in other toxic neuropathies. A vitamin B6 substance dependency may exist in daily dosages of 200 mg or more, making a drug withdrawal effect possible when discontinued.

See also 

 B vitamins
 Dietary Reference Intake
 Dietary supplement
 Hypervitaminosis
 Hypervitaminosis A 
 Hypervitaminosis D
 Megavitamin therapy
 Overnutrition
 Peripheral nervous system
 Regulation of alternative medicine

Notes

References

Further reading 
 A chapter with a story about a woman experiencing a severe case of Megavitamin-B6 syndrome titled "The Disembodied Lady" appears in Chapter 3 of The Man Who Mistook His Wife for a Hat:  
 An ethnographic study of an online support group for megavitamin B6 syndrome appears in:

External links 
 StatPearls - Vitamin B6 Toxicity

Effects of external causes
Hypervitaminosis
Syndromes